Manasses II, Count of Rethel (died 1032) was a son of Manasses of Omont and his wife, Castricia.  He manifested himself in the early 11th century as Count of Rethel.

He was married to Dada (possibly either Judith or Yvette), according to a recent study she was most likely the sister of Eble I of Roucy, and a maternal granddaughter of Ermentrude de Roucy.

He was the father of Manasses III, who succeeded him, and perhaps Doda, the wife of Godfrey III, Duke of Lower Lorraine.

References 

11th-century French people
1032 deaths
Year of birth unknown
Counts of Rethel